The 1984 North Dakota State Bison football team was an American football team that represented North Dakota State University during the 1984 NCAA Division II football season as a member of the North Central Conference. In their sixth year under head coach Don Morton, the team compiled an 11–2 record, finished as NCC co-champion, and lost to Troy State in the NCAA Division II championship game.

Schedule

References

North Dakota State
North Dakota State Bison football seasons
North Central Conference football champion seasons
North Dakota State Bison football